Bill Brown (born May 20, 1957) is an American baseball coach. He served as the head baseball coach of the George Mason Patriots from 1982 to 2022.

Playing career
Raised in Vienna, Virginia, Brown helped lead his George C. Marshall High School team to the Virginia State Finals in his senior season of 1975.  He then played a single season each at Georgia and Allegany Community College before arriving at George Mason.  He played two seasons as a catcher with the Patriots, earning NAIA All-District honors in his junior season.

Coaching career
After his playing days ended, Brown worked in the Mason Athletic Department while he completed his degree, serving as an assistant baseball coach from 1980 to 1981 under new head coach Walt Masterson.  Upon Masterson's retirement, Brown was elevated to head coach.  Under Brown, the Patriots have seen 27 players drafted in the Major League Baseball Draft, four of whom have reached the Majors.  Mason has reached seven NCAA Regionals and claimed three conference championships.  Brown was named Colonial Athletic Association Coach of the Year a record six times before the Patriots moved to the Atlantic 10 Conference beginning with the 2014 season. On July 8, 2022, Brown stepped down as the head coach of the Patriots.

Head coaching record
Below is a table of Brown's records as a collegiate head baseball coach.

Notes

References

1957 births
Allegany Trojans baseball players
Baseball catchers
George Mason Patriots baseball coaches
George Mason Patriots baseball players
Georgia Bulldogs baseball players
Living people
People from Vienna, Virginia
Sportspeople from Fairfax County, Virginia